Eliza or ELIZA may refer to:

 Eliza (given name), a female given name (including a list of people and characters with the name)
 ELIZA, a 1966 computer program designed to simulate a therapist or psychoanalyst
 ELIZA effect, the tendency to relate computer behavior to human behavior
 Eliza (magazine), an American fashion magazine
 Eliza (ship), several ships
 Eliza (horse), an American Thoroughbred racehorse

Arts and entertainment
 Eliza (Arne), a 1754 opera by Thomas Arne
 Eliza (Cherubini), a 1794 opera by Luigi Cherubini
 Eliza (sculpture), a public artwork in the Swan River, Western Australia
 "Eliza", a song by Phish from their 1992 album A Picture of Nectar
 Eliza (English singer), English singer and songwriter formerly known as Eliza Doolittle
 Eliza (video game), a 2019 video game

See also
 Aliza, feminine given name
 Elijah (prophet)
 Elisa (given name)
 ELISA (biochemical analytical procedure)
 Elise (disambiguation)
 Liza (disambiguation)